Lorita scarificata, the chrysanthemum flower borer or Lora Aborn's moth, is a moth of the  family Tortricidae. It is native to North America (where it has been recorded from Florida and California) and is an introduced species in Hawaii.

The wingspan is 10–12 mm.

The larvae have been recorded feeding on Chrysanthemum blossoms, Cuscuta californica and green bell pepper.

Etymology
Lorita abornana or Lora Aborn's moth was named for composer, performer and pianist Lora Aborn. It is now considered a synonym of Lorita scarificata.

External links
Images
Lora Aborn website

Cochylini
Moths described in 1917